Oskar Zeissner (3 November 1928 – 17 May 1997) was a German cyclist. He competed in the individual and team road race events at the 1952 Summer Olympics.

References

External links
 

1928 births
1997 deaths
German male cyclists
Olympic cyclists of Germany
Cyclists at the 1952 Summer Olympics
People from Schweinfurt (district)
Sportspeople from Lower Franconia
Cyclists from Bavaria
20th-century German people